Tom Smith may refer to:

Sports

Association football
Tom Smith (footballer, born 1876) (1876–1937), scorer for Tottenham Hotspur in the 1901 FA Cup Final replay
Tom Smith (footballer, born 1877) (1877–?), English footballer with Preston North End, Southampton and Queens Park Rangers
Tom Smith (footballer, born 1900) (1900–1934), English footballer with Leicester City, Manchester United and Northampton Town
Tom Smith (footballer, born 1909) (1909–1998), Scottish footballer with Kilmarnock, Preston North End and Scotland, also managed Kilmarnock
Tom Smith (footballer, born 1911) (1911–1986), English footballer for Rochdale and Luton Town
Tom Smith (footballer, born 1973), Scottish footballer with Partick Thistle, Ayr United, Clydebank and Hibernian
Tom Smith (footballer, born 1998), English footballer with Swindon Town

Baseball
Tom Smith (second baseman) (1851–1889), Major League player
Tom Smith (pitcher) (1871–1929), Major League player
Tom Smith (UNC Asheville baseball coach), American college baseball coach
Tom Smith (baseball coach, born 1942), American college baseball coach for Michigan State

Cricket
Tom Smith (cricketer, born 1906) (1906–1995), English cricketer for Essex
Tom Smith (cricketer, born 1985), English cricketer who currently plays for Lancashire
Tom Smith (cricketer, born 1987), English cricketer who currently plays for Gloucestershire
Tom Smith (cricketer, born 1996), English cricketer

Rugby union
Tom Smith (rugby union, born 1883) (1883–1960), English rugby union player
Tom Smith (rugby union, born 1893) (c. 1893 – c. 1965), Australian rugby union player
Tom Smith (rugby union, born 1953), Scottish rugby union player
Tom Smith (rugby union, born 1971) (1971–2022), Scottish rugby union player
Tom Smith (rugby union, born 1985), Welsh rugby union player
Thom Smith, (born 1999) English rugby union player

Other sports
Tom Smith (horse trainer) (1878–1957), American thoroughbred racehorse trainer of Seabiscuit
Tom Smith (Australian footballer) (1873–1928), Australian rules footballer
Tom Smith (American football) (born 1949), American football player
Tom Smith (basketball) (born 1944), American college basketball coach
Tom Smith (fencer), Irish Olympic fencer

Arts
Tom Smith (filker), American musician
Tom Smith (make-up artist) (1920–2009), British make-up artist
Tom and Matt Smith, American university professor and jazz musician, with his son Matt
Tom Smith (musician) (born 1981), lead singer of British rock band Editors
Tom Smith (Christian musician) (born 1988), member of Soul Survivor
Tom Smith (playwright) (born 1969), American playwright and theater director
Tom Rob Smith (born 1979), British author
Tom Smith (author), American business executive and author
Tom Smith (artist), American-born abstract artist

Others
Tom Smith (confectioner) (1823–1869), confectioner and inventor of the Christmas cracker
Thomas J. Smith (1830–1870), known as Tom "Bear River" Smith, American law officer
Tom Smith (British politician) (1886–1953), British politician
Tom Smith (Australian politician) (1890–1975), New South Wales politician
Tom Smith (Queensland politician), Australian politician
Tom Smith (Arizona politician) (1927–2014), Arizona politician
Tom Smith (Pennsylvania politician) (1947–2015), American businessman and political candidate
Tom Smith (West Virginia politician), American highway engineer
Tom Smith (trade unionist) (1900s–1970), British trade union leader
 Tom Smith (engineer) (1927–2012), Grimsby-born British aerospace engineer, led the BAC MUSTARD late 1960s project

See also
Thomas Smith (disambiguation)
Tommy Smith (disambiguation)
Thomas Smyth (disambiguation)